Stenocereus eruca, commonly known as the creeping devil, is a member of the family Cactaceae. It is one of the most distinctive cacti, a member of the relatively small genus Stenocereus. It is endemic to the central Pacific coast of Baja California Sur, and is found only on sandy soils, where it forms massive colonies.

As with all cacti, creeping devil is succulent, and is reported to contain mescaline and sterols. Growth patterns can be widely scattered as individual stems; in favorable localities they can form impenetrable patches of branching stems measuring several metres across. The creeping devil is columnar, with a very spiny stem which is creamy green in color, averaging 5 cm in diameter and 1.5-2 m long, with only the terminal end raised from the ground.  A height of 20-30 cm is normal since this cactus is recumbent. The large, nocturnal flowers are white, pink, or yellow; usually 10-14 cm long with a spiny ovary, and flowering sparingly in response to rain. The spiny fruit is 3-4 cm long with black seeds.

Creeping devil lies on the ground and grows at one end while the other end slowly dies, with a succession of new roots developing on the underside of the stem. The growth rate is adapted to the moderate, moist marine environment of the Baja peninsula, and can achieve in excess of 60 cm per year, but when transplanted to a hot, arid environment the cacti can grow as little as 60 cm per decade. Over the course of many years, the entire cactus will slowly travel, with stems branching and taking root toward the growing tips, while older stem portions die and disintegrate. This traveling chain of growth gives rise to the name eruca, which means "caterpillar", as well as the common name creeping devil.

Stenocereus eruca is considered the "most extreme case of clonal propagation in the cactus family" (Gibson and Nobel, 1986). This means that due to isolation and scarcity of pollinating creatures, the plant is able to clone itself.  This is done by pieces detaching from the major shoot as their bases die and rot.  

Other members of this genus that are found in the Baja Peninsula of California are Stenocereus thurberi (Organ Pipe Cactus, Pitaya Dulce) and Stenocereus gummosus (Sour Pitaya, Pitaya Agria, Pitayha). While once thought to be threatened with extinction, further evidence showed it not to be so. Transplantation, while not recommended due to environmentally specific factors, can be successful with strict adherence to maintaining conditions which mirror the native environment.

References
 Clark-Tapia R, Mandujano MC, Valverde T, et al. (2005). How important is clonal recruitment for population maintenance in rare plant species? The case of the narrow endemic cactus, Stenocereus eruca, in Baja California, Mexico. Biol. Conserv. 124 (1): 123-132 Online
 Dimmitt, Mark A. (1998). Cactaceae (cactus family). 
 Faucon, Philippe (1998-2005). Creeping Devil Cactus, Chirinole.
 Gibson A. C. P. S. Nobel 1986 The cactus primer. Harvard University Press, Cambridge, Massachusetts, USA
 Lauri, Bob (2000). Ocean Oasis Field Guide. 

eruca
Flora of Baja California Sur